Caloptilia macranthes is a moth of the family Gracillariidae. It is known from Texas, United States.

References

macranthes
Moths of North America
Moths described in 1928